Faryaad is a 2020 Pakistani television family drama series aired on ARY Digital from 4 December 2020 to 9 April 2021. It is produced by Humayun Saeed, Shahzad Nasib, Sana Shahnawaz and Samina Humayun Saeed under Six Sigma Plus and Next Level Entertainment. It stars Zahid Ahmed, Aiza Awan, Adeel Chaudhry and Nawal Saeed in lead roles. The story revolves around love birds Haroon and Mahnoor, their love didn't materialize and they had to suffer at the handS of fate.

The serial released on ARY Digital airing three episodes per week (on Friday, Saturday and Sunday) on 7:00 PST.

Cast
Zahid Ahmed as Muraad Ali
Adeel Chaudhry as Haroon
Aiza Awan as Mahnoor
Nawal Saeed as Anum
Zainab Qayyum as Nazia: Haroon's mother
Gul-e-Rana as Nuzhat Ara: Muraad's mother
Sana Askari as Haseena: Muraad's sister
Mariam Ansari as Malika: Muraad's sister
Aamna Malick as Shahzadi: Muraad's sister
Naveed Raza as Shoaib: Haseena's husband
Tabbasum Arif as Sakeena: Mahnoor's mother
Malik Raza as Mahnoor's father
Saba Shah
Raja Haider as Haris: Haroon’s father
Fahad Ahmed
Abdul Rahim (child star)
Hassan Shah

References

2020 Pakistani television series debuts
Urdu-language television shows
ARY Digital original programming